In file sharing, super-seeding (aka 'Initial Seeding') is an algorithm developed by John Hoffman for the BitTorrent communications protocol that helps downloaders become uploaders more quickly, but it introduces the danger of total seeding failure if there is only one downloader.

The algorithm applies when there is only one seed in the swarm. By permitting each downloader to download only specific parts of the files listed in a torrent, it allows peers to start seeding more quickly. Peers attached to a seed with super-seeding enabled therefore distribute pieces of the torrent file much more readily before they have completed the download themselves.

In 2003, BitTornado became the first BitTorrent client to implement the algorithm.

Effects
Testing by one group found that super seeding can help save an upload ratio of around 20%. It works best when the upload speed of the seed is greater than that of individual peers.

Super seeding transfers stall when there is only one downloading client. The seeders will not send more data until a second client receives the data. To avoid this, rTorrent continues to offer more pieces to the peers without waiting for confirmation, until it is uploading at its configured capacity. This improves the upload speed until enough peers have joined the swarm, at the cost of not being able to detect cheating peers, who engage in such anti-social actions as downloading only from seeds, downloading from the fastest peers, or advertising false pieces.

Supporting clients

References

External links
 Description of original super-seed algorithm in BitTornado
 Report by Robb Toploski (Issue #4 & 5 are regarding Super Seeding)

BitTorrent

de:BitTorrent#Superseeding